Natriciteres bipostocularis, the southwestern forest marsh snake, is a species of natricine snake found in Zambia, the Democratic Republic of the Congo, and Angola.

References

Natriciteres
Reptiles of Zambia
Reptiles of the Democratic Republic of the Congo
Reptiles of Angola
Reptiles described in 1962
Taxa named by Donald George Broadley